Þorvaldur (English transliteration: Thorvaldur)  is an Icelandic masculine given name and may refer to:
Þorvaldur Örlygsson (born 1966), Icelandic football  midfielder
Þorvaldur Sigbjörnsson (born 1974), Icelandic footballer
Þorvaldur Skúlason (1906–1984), Icelandic painter
Þorvaldur Thoroddsen (1855–1921), Icelandic geologist and geographer

See also
Thorvald
Torvald (disambiguation)

Icelandic masculine given names